Yorkshire Water is a water supply and treatment utility company servicing West Yorkshire, South Yorkshire, the East Riding of Yorkshire, part of North Lincolnshire, most of North Yorkshire and part of Derbyshire, in England. The company has its origins in the Yorkshire Water Authority, one of ten regional water authorities created by the Water Act 1973, and privatised under the terms of the Water Act 1989, when Yorkshire Water plc, the parent company of the Yorkshire Water business, was floated on the London Stock Exchange. The parent company was Kelda Group in 1999.  
In February 2008, Kelda Group was bought by a consortium of infrastructure funds.

It is regulated under the Water Industry Act 1991.

Area
The company's area includes West Yorkshire, South Yorkshire, the East Riding of Yorkshire, part of North Lincolnshire, most of North Yorkshire and part of Derbyshire. The area is adjoined on the north by that of Northumbrian Water, on the west by United Utilities, on the south west by Severn Trent Water and on the south by Anglian Water.

Environmental record
Yorkshire Water has received fines for breaches of environmental law. For example:
 Yorkshire Water was fined twice in April 2007. The first offence was for allowing polluting matter to enter Clifton beck in Brighouse, contrary to section 85(1) of the Water Resources Act 1991. The final incident killed one third of the wildlife along over a mile of the stream. A further incident in the same beck led to a fine of £2,400 in 2004. Yorkshire Water argued that the blockage causing the offence was caused by a third party. Eleven days later, the company was in court again to admit to breaching its discharge consent at its Neiley sewage works, Honley. The discharge consent allowed for biological oxygen demand to exceed 21 mg/L more than three times a year. The Environment Agency demonstrated that the works had breached this limit five times in 2005, resulting in a fine of £16,000 plus £754 in costs.
 Yorkshire Water was fined £6,000 and ordered to pay £9,051 in costs for supplying "unfit water" in May 2006 in a prosecution brought by the Drinking Water Inspectorate, under the Water Industry Act 1991. It pleaded guilty to three offences. Properties in Harlow Moor, Harrogate, had received discoloured water supplies in February 2004, which was caused by work on its supply mains stirring up sediment. About 1,200 properties were affected and 64 customers complained. The Drinking Water Inspectorate said to the ENDS Report that this was not the first time that the company had failed to check valves before working on its distribution mains. Before this incident, the DWI had prosecuted it four times.
 Yorkshire Water's largest fine, of £119,000 (reduced to £80,000 on appeal), with costs of £125,598, was received in December 2000 after pleading guilty to seventeen charges of supplying water unfit for human consumption.
 Yorkshire Water was investigated under caution in October 2008 by the Environment Agency following a leak of sewage into Whitby Harbour.  The leak was caused by a pump failure and resulted in sewage leaking into the harbour for 52 hours.

Performance
In June 1996, Yorkshire Water was effectively fined £40 million by the regulator, Ofwat, by freezing their ability to raise bills for customers. This was a result of what Ofwat described as a "failure to deliver the standards required to consumers". This fine was a result of being the most hated water company during the "year of the drought" (1995). However, Yorkshire Water's performance had turned around so much so that the company was awarded the title   by Utility Week magazine three years in succession while no other water company has won it more than once."

The company has been criticised (2022) for losing 283 million litres of water a day due to leakages.  The company says that this is a 50% reduction on the period 1995/96.

1992 Sludge tip blocks River Colne, Huddersfield
A landslip of sewage sludge engulfed a sewage works at Huddersfield in 1992. Almost  of sewage slipped from its Deighton waste tip on to the plant, and completely blocked  of the River Colne. The disaster also forced the closure of a nearby ICI plant.

1995 Year of Drought
For months between September 1995 and January 1996 reservoirs in the west side of the region ran dry, and water had to be taken by (up to) 700 tankers (delivering  of water a day) from the east side of the region near Goole in a convoy of trucks, with 3,500 daily deliveries along the M62 in a drastic emergency measure which cost £3 million a week, eventually totalling £33 million for the entire tankering operation. The trucks were famously shown on TV delivering water into Booth Wood Reservoir. The company has now built a pipeline from the east to the west to allow the balancing of water levels should the need arise. Following the "year of drought", Yorkshire Water became known as "the most hated water company" during this period, with "staff having to travel in unmarked vans for fear of reprisals". Many suspected Yorkshire Water would never be able to win back customers' trust.

2007 Hull floods

The company came under intense criticism when the Bransholme pumping station failed, worsening the flood damage to the city and flooding two thousand homes on the Kingswood and Bransholme estates. The pumping station was upgraded in 2016.

2022 Sheffield gas supply outage

Yorkshire Water were criticised in December 2022 when a burst water main operated by the company caused flooding in the Stannington area of Sheffield, which subsequently entered the local gas network and left thousands of properties without a natural gas supply for more than a week amid below-freezing temperatures. The burst water main occurred during the evening of 2 December and leaked more than 400,000 litres of water into the local gas pipe network before finally being fully repaired five days later. Sheffield City Council declared a major incident and aid was distributed to residents as a result of the crisis.

Customer service
Yorkshire Water ranked 11th of 21 water companies in Ofwat's 'Satisfaction by company' survey 2012/13.

in January 2015 the UK Customer Service Index (UKCSI) announced that Yorkshire Water was the leader for service in the Utilities sector, they were also the second most improved organisation in the whole UKCSI, beating competitors such as  Severn Trent, Anglian, Thames Water as well as United Utilities and EDF.

The UKCSI is the only external measure showing the state of customer satisfaction in the UK and allows individuals to benchmark across all sectors as well as utilities.

Drinking water quality
Not taking into account human composition:
In the year ending 31 March 2013, 99.93% of Yorkshire Water's samples met the UK standards; in the previous year it was 99.95%.

Carbon footprint
In 2012/13 the company's greenhouse gas emissions totalled 386 kilotonnes, compared to 394 kilotonnes the previous year.

Constituents
The authority created in 1973 took over the following public sector water supply utilities:

 Barnsley Corporation
 Bradford Corporation
 Huddersfield Corporation
 Kingston upon Hull Corporation
 Leeds Corporation
 Rotherham Corporation
 Scarborough Corporation
 Sheffield Corporation
 Norton Urban District Council
 Rawmarsh Urban District Council
 Calderdale Water Board
 Claro Water Board
 Craven Water Board
 Doncaster and District Joint Water Board
 East Yorkshire (Wolds Area) Water Board
 Mid Calder Water Board
 Northallerton and the Dales Water Board
 Pontefract, Goole and Selby Water Board
 Rombalds Water Board
 Ryedale Joint Water Board
 Wakefield and District Water Board
 Yorkshire River Authority

In early 1999 the company took over York Waterworks Company, a small water-only company serving the city of York.

Reservoirs

Yorkshire Water allows recreational use of some of 113 of its 120+ reservoirs. Activities include walking, fishing, horse riding, cycling, water sports and bird watching. Several sailing clubs are afforded the use of certain reservoirs for their sailing activities, including Boshaw Whams, Embsay, Grimwith, Ponden, Scar House, Thornton Steward, and Warley Moor Reservoirs. 

Since privatisation of the water authorities in 1989, Yorkshire Water has made many of its locations accessible to the public, which not only cover water, but woodland and moorland. Walks exist around Brayton Barff, Fewston, Grimwith, Langsett, More Hall, Scammoden, Thruscross, and Undebank reservoirs. Additionally, in 2008, Yorkshire Water teamed up with long-distance walking writer Mark Reid to create the Yorkshire Water Way, a   walk which takes in Yorkshire Water Reservoirs along its route.

 Agden Reservoir
 Angram Reservoir
 Baitings Reservoir
 Beaver Dyke Reservoirs
 Bilberry Reservoir
 Blackmoorfoot Reservoir
 Blakeley Reservoir
 Booth Wood Reservoir
 Boshaw Whams Reservoir
 Brayton Barff
 Broadstones Reservoir
 Broomhead Reservoir
 Brownhill Reservoir
 Butterley Reservoir
 Carr Bottom Reservoir
 Chelker Reservoir
 Cod Beck Reservoir
 Cupwith Reservoir
 Dale Dike Reservoir
 Damflask Reservoir
 Dean Head Reservoir
 Deer Hill Reservoir
 Digley Reservoir
 Doe Park Reservoir
 East Ardsley Reservoir
 Eccup Reservoir
 Embsay Reservoir
 Fewston Reservoir
 Gorple Reservoir
 Gouthwaite Reservoir
 Graincliffe Reservoir
 Grimwith Reservoir
 Harden Clough Reservoir
 Haworth Moor Reservoir
 Hewenden Reservoir
 Holme Styes Reservoir
 Ingbirchworth Reservoir
 Keighley Moor Reservoir
 Langsett Reservoir
 Leeshaw Reservoir
 Leighton Reservoir
 Longwood Reservoir
 Lower Barden Reservoir
 Lower Laithe Reservoir
 Lower Windelden Reservoir
 Manshead Reservoir
 March Ghyll Reservoir
 More Hall Reservoir
 Ogden Reservoir
 Ponden Reservoir
 Ramsden Wood Reservoir
 Redmires Reservoirs
 Reva Reservoir
 Ringstone Edge Reservoir
 Rivelin Reservoir
 Roundhill Reservoir
 Royd Moor Reservoir
 Ryburn Reservoir
 Scammonden Reservoir
 Scargill Reservoir
 Scar House Reservoir
 Scout Dike Reservoir
 Swinsty Reservoir
 Thornton Steward Reservoir
 Thruscross Reservoir
 Timble Reservoir
 Tophill Low Reservoir and Nature Reserve
 Underbank Reservoir
 Upper Barden Reservoir
 Upper Windleden Reservoir
 Walshaw Dean Reservoirs
 Watersheddles Reservoir (in Lancashire, but supplies West Yorkshire)
 Wessendean Head Reservoir
 Wessenden Reservoir
 Wheecher Reservoir
 Whinney Gill Reservoir
 Widdop Reservoir
 Winscar Reservoir
 Withens Clough Reservoir

References

Sources

External links

Video clips
 Yorkshire Water at YouTube
 Report into Hull floods in November 2007
  Pumping station fails in June 2007 and Yorkshire Water apologises on the BBC

Water companies of England
Former nationalised industries of the United Kingdom
Companies based in Bradford
Organizations established in 1973
1973 establishments in England